The 1963–64 Drexel Dragons men's basketball team represented Drexel Institute of Technology during the 1963–64 men's basketball season. The Dragons, led by 12th year head coach Samuel Cozen, played their home games at Sayre High School and were members of the College–Southern division of the Middle Atlantic Conferences (MAC).

Roster

Schedule

|-
!colspan=9 style="background:#F8B800; color:#002663;"| Regular season
|-

|-
!colspan=9 style="background:#F8B800; color:#002663;"| 1964 Middle Atlantic Conference men's basketball tournament

References

Drexel Dragons men's basketball seasons
Drexel
1963 in sports in Pennsylvania
1964 in sports in Pennsylvania